Acizzia uncatoides is a species of psyllid native to Australia where it feeds primarily on Acacia (especially Acacia melanoxylon) and some Albizia species. It is present in many parts of the world where it infests these plant species, presumably introduced with the plants. It is not generally regarded as a pest species although it can proliferate to high numbers. Generalist psyllid predators also feed on this species.

References 

Psyllidae
Hemiptera of Australia
Insects described in 1932